Sleepthief is the eponymous debut album by German jazz saxophonist Ingrid Laubrock's free improvisation trio with British pianist Liam Noble and American drummer Tom Rainey. It was recorded in 2007 and released on the Swiss Intakt label. Laubrock and Noble played together since 2005 and recorded the duo Let's Call This.... While Rainey was visiting the UK they decided to get together and Sleepthief was born.

Reception
The All About Jazz review by Chris May states, "In British pianist Liam Noble and American drummer Tom Rainey, Laubrock has found the perfect partners—restlessly inventive, provocative, deep, infinitely nuanced, spontaneously architectural."

In a review for The Guardian, John Fordham notes that, "The music is free-jazz, but full of contrasts. Some of it finds the Monkish Noble banging chords while Rainey plays scattered patterns at half his speed, some has Laubrock's gruff, Evan Parkerish trills and whirrs drifting up and down over piano-string twangs and arrhythmic clatters."

Track listing
All compositions by Laubrock, Noble, Rainey
 "Zugunruhe" – 8:19
 "Sleepthief"  – 10:30
 "Oofy Twerp" – 5:54
 "Never Were Not" – 9:55
 "Environmental Stud" – 7:04
 "The Ears Have It" – 8:33
 "Batchelor's Know-how" – 5:39
 "Social Cheats" – 4:39
 "Amelie" – 3:05

Personnel
Ingrid Laubrock – saxophones, piano on 9
Liam Noble – piano
Tom Rainey – drums

References
 

2008 albums
Ingrid Laubrock albums
Intakt Records albums